Momsen may refer to:

Charles Momsen (1896–1967), American pioneer in submarine rescue for the United States Navy
Richard Paul Momsen (1891–1965), American/Brazilian lawyer, US Consul General in Rio de Janeiro
Taylor Momsen (born 1993), American actress, musician and model
Tony Momsen (1928–1994), American football center in the National Football League

See also
Momsen lung, primitive underwater rebreather used before and during World War II by American submariners as emergency escape gear
, an Arleigh Burke-class destroyer in the United States Navy
Mom Song (disambiguation)
Mommsen
Monson (surname), another surname